Zoaga is a department or commune of Boulgou Province in eastern Burkina Faso. Its capital lies at the town of Zoaga. According to the 1996 census the department has a total population of 11,295.

Towns and villages
 Zoaga (2 395 inhabitants) (capital)
 Bingo (1 119 inhabitants) 
 Bougre De Zoaga (1 485 inhabitants) 
 Bourma De Zoaga (787 inhabitants) 
 Dawega (501 inhabitants) 
 Koukoadore (150 inhabitants) 
 Mong-Naba (832 inhabitants) 
 Pakoungou (786 inhabitants) 
 Pargou (1 180 inhabitants) 
 Tabissi (167 inhabitants) 
 Zame (829 inhabitants) 
 Zerboko (496 inhabitants) 
 Zoaga-Peulh (361 inhabitants) 
 Zoaga-Yarce (207 inhabitants)

References

Departments of Burkina Faso
Boulgou Province